Grigory Alexandrovich Feldmanru (1884–1958) was a mathematician and economist from the Soviet Union. He qualified as an electrical engineer and joined the State Planning Committee (Gosplan) in 1923 where he worked until 1931. Initially he worked on analysing the German and United States economies as part of the world economy. After completing his analysis of the US economy from 1850 to 1925, he started working on a model for use in planning for the Soviet economy. He presented his report On the Theory of the Rates of Growth of the National Income (en: Parts One and Two) to the Gosplan committee for long-term planning in 1928.

Feldman–Mahalanobis model

The Feldman–Mahalanobis model was partially named after Prasanta Chandra Mahalanobis who developed a similar model to that previously developed by Feldman as the basis for the Second Indian Five Year plan (1956–1961). This was based on an economic development model developed by Mahalanobis in 1953.

Reading 
On the Theory of Growth Rates of National Income, I

On the Theory of Growth Rates of National Income, 2

The Analytical Method of Constructing Perspective Plans

References

Soviet economists
1884 births
1958 deaths
Bauman Moscow State Technical University alumni